Javed Malik is a diplomat, noted media personality and the President of the Diplomat Business Club based in London and Dubai. Malik served as Pakistan's Ambassador to the Kingdom of Bahrain between 2015  and 2018, and the Prime Minister's Special Envoy for Trade and Investment between 2013 and 2018. Earlier, Malik also served as Pakistan's Ambassador at Large for Overseas Pakistanis between 2008 and 2011. Currently he is the President of International Diplomat Forum based out of London, Dubai and Islamabad.

Career

Diplomat Business Club
Malik is the current president of the Diplomat Business Club, an international trade and economic diplomacy forum that connects business and corporate leaders to explore trade and investment opportunities. He is also the regional director MENA of the Ambassador Partnership LLP.

Ambassador to the Kingdom of Bahrain
In 2016, Javed Malik was appointed as Pakistan's Ambassador to the Kingdom of Bahrain.

He presented his credentials to His Majesty King Hamad Al Khalifa in March 2016, and during his tenure the relations between Pakistan and Bahrain were upgraded to a Joint Ministerial
Commission which held its first session in December 2016 under the co-chairmanship of
Bahrain’s Foreign Minister Sheikh Khalid Bin Ahmad Al Khalifa and Pakistan’s Foreign Minister
Sartaj Aziz. The Commission agreed a roadmap to expand the diplomatic, political, trade,
economic, people to people and cultural ties between both countries. This was followed by the
Pakistan Bahrain Business Opportunities Conferences both in Pakistan and Bahrain led by the
Commerce Minsters and Presidents of Chambers of Commerce of both countries.

In the same year, An MOU to establish the King Hamad University in Islamabad was also signed
during Javed Malik’s tenure, which serves as a symbol of the strong bonds of friendship between
Pakistan and Bahrain.

Prime Minister's Special Envoy for Trade & Investment
In 2013, Javed Malik was appointed as Pakistan's Special Envoy to the GCC. with the rank of an
Ambassador by the Prime Minister and given the mandate to promote business, trade and
investment opportunities in Pakistan. In this capacity, he initiated a series of activities and
encouraged international investors to visit Pakistan and organised a number of seminars
and conferences to highlight trade and investment opportunities in Pakistan.

Pakistan's Ambassador at Large
In 2008, the Prime Minister of Pakistan appointed Javed Malik as Pakistan's Ambassador at Large with the status of a minister.

In this capacity, he advised and assisted the Prime Minister on issues relating to Overseas Pakistanis. He established the Overseas Pakistanis forum, which held its first session in the UAE, and he also organized the Friends of Pakistan Conference in Islamabad in which UK Parliamentarians also took part.

Media
Malik has a noted background in print and television media since 1999 as a prominent political and international affairs analyst and television host. He began his television career in London with Prime TV and later with ARY News, where he hosted, "Insight" - An Current Affairs talk show for more than ten years. He is also associated with Geo News / Jang Group and writes for their publications, The News International and Daily Jang. He also writes for the Middle East publication, Khaleej Times. and continues to appear on various television shows as an international affairs analyst.

See also 
List of Pakistani journalists
Pakistan Federal Union of Journalists

References

Pakistani male journalists
Pakistani expatriates in the United Kingdom
Pakistani expatriates in the United Arab Emirates
Year of birth missing (living people)
Living people
Pakistan Television Corporation executives
Ambassadors of Pakistan to Bahrain